Haji Abad Japlogh may refer to:
 Haji Abad Japlogh, Lorestan
 Haji Abad Japlogh, Markazi